Danny Killeen (February 6, 1933 – April 28, 2017) was an American sailor. He competed in the Dragon event at the 1956 Summer Olympics.

References

External links
 

1933 births
2017 deaths
American male sailors (sport)
Olympic sailors of the United States
Sailors at the 1956 Summer Olympics – Dragon
Sportspeople from New Orleans